Brother Max Thurian (16 August 1921 in Geneva, Switzerland – 15 August 1996 in Geneva, Switzerland) was the subprior of the Taizé community, an ecumenical monastic community in France. He was the subprior at Taizé from the time of its inception in the 1940s. During the Second Vatican Council, he was invited by Pope Paul VI to observe the liturgical reform of the Catholic Mass. In 1969 he expressed that he was satisfied with the reforms of the Second Vatican Council, under the belief that Protestants could receive Holy Communion along with Roman Catholics. This is false, however, as the Roman Catholic Church forbids non-Catholics from reception of Holy Communion at the Mass. On 12 May 1988 Thurian converted to Roman Catholicism and was ordained a priest. On 24 July 1996 Thurian published an article in L'Osservatore Romano, in which, while maintaining his complete approval for the liturgical reform, he lamented that in its practical implementation there was a risk that the Mass would lose "its character of mystery".

References

1921 births
1996 deaths
Clergy from Geneva
Members of Christian religious orders
Converts to Roman Catholicism from Evangelicalism
20th-century Swiss Roman Catholic priests